Corey Spear Hulsey (born July 26, 1977) is a former American football guard. He was originally signed by the Buffalo Bills as an undrafted free agent in 1999. After the 2008 preseason, he was waived by the Lions during final cuts on August 31, 2008. He played college football at Clemson.

Hulsey also played for the Oakland Raiders.

External links
Detroit Lions bio

1977 births
Living people
People from Gainesville, Georgia
Sportspeople from the Atlanta metropolitan area
Players of American football from Georgia (U.S. state)
American football offensive guards
Clemson Tigers football players
Buffalo Bills players
Amsterdam Admirals players
Oakland Raiders players
Detroit Lions players